Dr. Michael Sampson is a Fulbright Scholar and an American children's writer best known for easy-to-read books that feature rhythmic and repetitive language.  Sampson's first children's book, The Football That Won, was written solo in 1992 and illustrated by Ted Rand.  Later, Sampson wrote 21 books with his best friend and mentor Bill Martin, Jr., including Chicka, Chicka, 1, 2, 3 and The Bill Martin Jr Big Book of Poetry. Sampson taught at Texas A&M University–Commerce for 25 years before moving to the University of South Florida St. Petersburg.  In August 2010 he was selected as Dean of the School of Education at Southern Connecticut State University. In July 2012 he became Dean of the College of Education at Northern Arizona University. In the summer of 2014, he moved to New York City to become Dean of the School of Education at St. John's University. In 2021-2022, he will teach at a university in Europe as a Fulbright Scholar.

Early life 

Born in Denison, Texas  to Roy and Ida Faye Sampson, Sampson studied in the Denison public schools until grade three, at which time his family (brothers Bill and Bryan and sister Patsy) moved to Tom Bean, Texas. As early as fourth grade, Sampson dreamed of one day being a writer. By the time he reached fifth grade, he had read every book in the Tom Bean library. He had written a series of books featuring Frank and Joe of The Hardy Boys fame, and even had a poem published in a national magazine. In sixth grade he joined the school's junior high football team, and received the inspiration for a book he would publish 30 years later, The Football That Won. He lived for football and books in grades 6–12.  During summers, he worked as a lumberjack in Damariscotta, Maine, building his body strength. As a senior, he was a captain on the Tom Bean Tomcats football team, where he won the school's academic award and was named to the Class B Texas State All Star Team.

Education 

During high school, Michael Sampson worked as a lumberjack in Maine during the summers and as a short order cook at a café in Sherman, Texas from 5 until 11 P.M. most nights.  Despite this, he won a scholarship to East Texas State University, where he earned a degree in 1974 in Political Science with a teaching endorsement. He became a teacher in the Commerce public schools, where he taught grades K-3; 4, and 6.  During this time he attended evening classes, earning a Master of Sciences degree in Reading.   He left Texas for Arizona in 1977 to enroll in the Ph.D. program at the University of Arizona, where he studied under Roach Van Allan, and Ken and Yetta Goodman. He completed his Ph.D. in Reading in 1980.

Academic writing 

In 1980 Michael Sampson accepted a faculty position at Texas S&M University–Commerce. In 1986 he published his first professional book, The Pursuit of Literacy. Four years later he published the creative, theme-based literature program Experiences with Literacy, which was co-authored by Bill Teale and Roach Van Allen. In 1992, he published his book on the language arts, Pathways to Literacy. The second edition of Pathways to Literacy: Process Transactions was published in 1996 and the third edition, Total Literacy, in 2003. During these years, Sampson was also published in The Reading Teacher and The Reading Research Quarterly.  He is currently completing a text book on linguistics named Sounds of Language.

Collaboration with Bill Martin Jr 

Michael Sampson met children’s author and educator Bill Martin Jr at a reading conference in Tucson, Arizona in 1978. The two immediately become best friends and collaborators. Sampson began working with Bill Martin and his workshops for teachers that summer. Within five years, the two had built the conferences into the Pathways to Literacy Conference, with sites in 12 American cities. Martin named the land “Woodfrost” as a reflection of his love for Robert Frost and Frost's poetry about the woods. For the next 12 years, Sampson and Martin wrote daily, creating 21 books for children, including award winners: I Pledge Allegiance (illustrated by Chris Raschka) and New York Times best sellers Panda Bear, Panda Bear, What Do You See? (illustrated by Eric Carle) and  Chicka, Chicka, 1, 2, 3, (illustrated by Lois Ehlert). Sampson's book "Spunky Little Monkey" was published by Scholastic in 2017.

Michael Sampson and Bill Martin shared a common love of poetry. Speaking of his writing partner, Sampson said: “Poetry allowed him to become a reader – if he could hear it, he could read it. And as a writer, Bill worked with his ear. How his writing sounded was the most important thing. Poetry was his mentor. It inspired and guided him.”

Their picture book Kitty Cat, Kitty Cat, Are you Waking Up was featured on NBC's Today Show on December 12, 2008 and recommended as a great Christmas gift for young children.  The sequel, "Kitty Cat, Kitty Cat, Are you Going to Sleep"  was published in March 2011, and the third book in the series, "Kitty Cat, Kitty Cat, Are you Going to School?" was published in August, 2013.  His book with Simon & Schuster, Listen to the World, was published in March 2016, and celebrated  Bill Martin Jrs 100th birthday.

Later life 

After ascending to the rank of full professor at Texas A&M University–Commerce, where he was department head and director of the doctoral program, Sampson left for full-time writing and consulting in 2004. He used this time to do author visits across the United States and countries in South America and Eastern and Western Europe, including Italy, Great Britain, Germany and Ukraine. Many of these trips were made to military bases to entertain children of troops involved in the Middle Eastern wars.

In 2007, Sampson returned to academia to teach writing and research at the University of South Florida St. Petersburg. In 2010 Sampson became Dean of the School of Education at Southern Connecticut State University.  In July 2012, he became dean of the College of Education at Northern Arizona University.  Since 2014, he has lived and worked at St. John's University in New York City.   He continues to speak at schools, book festivals, and teacher conferences.

In the spring of 2020, Sampson was named by the US Department of State as a Fulbright Scholar to Ukraine for 2021, where he will teach at Oles Honchar Dnipro National University and Alfred Nobel University.

Awards
ALA Notable Children's Book(2003);  Book Links Editor’s Best of 2003;  3)Chicago Public Library Best Books for Children and Teens;  Parenting Magazine Book of the Year, 2004; Kansas 2005 Picture Book Award; Oppenheim Toy Portfolio Gold Award.; Philadelphia Children’s Please Touch Museum Book of the Year, 2007;  New York Public Library 100 Best Books for Reading and Sharing, 2008; Children's Literature Association of Utah's Beehive Book Award, 2011.

Books

Children's books 

Armadillo Antics. (2022)  By Bill Martin Jr and Michael Sampson.  Dallas: Brown Books Kids.

Chica chica uno dos tres. (2020) By Bill Martin Jr and Michael Sampson. New York: Simon & Schuster.

Spunky Little Monkey (2017) By Bill Martin Jr and Michael Sampson.  New York:  Scholastic.

Noah, Noah, What Do You See?  (2017)  By Bill Martin Jr and Michael Sampson. New York:  HarperCollins.

Listen to Our World  (2016)  By Bill Martin Jr and Michael Sampson.  New York:  Simon & Schuster.

Kitty Cat, Kitty Cat, Are you Going to School?  (2013) By Bill Martin Jr and Michael Sampson. New York: Two Lions Press, Amazon.

Kitty Cat, Kitty Cat, Are you Going to Sleep?  (2011) By Bill Martin Jr and Michael Sampson. New York: Marshall Cavendish.

I Love Our Earth. (2009) By Bill Martin Jr and Michael Sampson. Watertown, MA:  Charlesbridge.  (new paperback edition)

Brown Bear and Friends. (2008)   New York: Henry Holt. (Compilation; Sampson co-authored two of the four stories)

Bill Martin Jr Big Book of Poetry. (2008) By Bill Martin Jr and Michael Sampson.  New York:  Simon & Schuster.

Kitty Cat, Kitty Cat, Are you waking up? (2008) By Bill Martin Jr and Michael Sampson. New York: Marshall Cavendish.

Baby Bear, Baby Bear, Baby, Bear, What Do You See? (2007) New York: Henry Holt.  With Bill Martin Jr (Ghost)

I Love Our Earth. (2006) By Bill Martin Jr and Michael Sampson. Watertown, MA:  Charlesbridge.

Chicka, Chicka, 1, 2, 3.  (2004) By Bill Martin Jr and Michael Sampson.  New York:  Simon & Schuster.

Chicken Chuck (2004) By Bill & Bernard Martin and Michael Sampson. New York: Marshall Cavendish.

Panda Bear, Panda Bear, What Do You See?  (2003) New York: Henry Holt.  With Bill Martin Jr (Ghost).

Trick or Treat  (2002) By Bill Martin Jr and Michael Sampson.  New York:  Simon & Schuster.

Caddie the Gold Dog  (2002) By Michael Sampson & Bill Martin Jr.  New York:  Walker & Co.

I Pledge Allegiance  (2002)  By Bill Martin Jr and Michael Sampson.  Boston:  Candlewick.  Paperback edition published July 2004.

Rocket, Socket, Number Line  (2001) By Bill Martin Jr and Michael Sampson.  Illustrated by Keith Baker.  New York:  Henry Holt.

The Little Squeegy Bug (2001)  By Bill Martin Jr and Michael Sampson.  Illustrated by Patrick Corrigan.  New York: Winslow Press.

Little Granny Quarterback. (2001)  By Bill Martin Jr and Michael Sampson.  Illustrated by Michael Chesworth.  Boyds Mills Press: Boston.

Adam, Adam, What Do You See? (2001)  By Bill Martin Jr and Michael Sampson.  Illustrated by Cathy Felstead.  Candlewick Press: Boston.

Adam, Adam, What Do You See?  Nelson Edition  (2000)  By Bill Martin Jr and Michael Sampson.  Illustrated by Cathy Felstead.  Thomas Nelson & Co: Nashville.

The Football That Won…  (1999)   Michael Sampson.  First paperback edition published 1999 by Henry Holt & Company, New York.

City Scenes  (1999)  Bill Martin Jr & Michael Sampson  (Reprinted in Spanish).   Wellington, New Zealand:  Learning Media Limited.

Wild Bear  (1999)  Mary Beth & Michael Sampson  (Reprinted in Spanish).   Wellington, New Zealand:  Learning Media Limited.

Swish!  By Bill Martin Jr and Michael Sampson., Henry Holt, Fall, 1997.

Star of the Circus.  By Michael and Mary Beth Sampson.  Illustrated by Jose Aruego.  Henry Holt, Spring 1997.

The Football That Won…  By Michael Sampson.  Illustrated by Ted Rand.  Henry Holt,  Fall 1996.

Football Fever. By Michael Sampson.  Fall, 1997.  Learning Media, New Zealand.

Wild Bear.  By Mary Beth and Michael Sampson.  Fall, 1997.  Learning Media, New Zealand.

City Scenes. By Bill Martin Jr and Michael Sampson.  Fall, 1997.  Learning Media, New Zealand.

Yummy Tum Tee.  By Bill Martin Jr and Michael Sampson.  Illustrated by Olivier Dunrea.  Scott Foresman (Celebration Press),  Fall 1996.

Si Won’s Victory.  By Bill Martin Jr and Michael Sampson.  Illustrations by Floyd Cooper.   Scott Foresman (Celebration Press),  Fall 1996.

Academic publications 

Sampson, M. R., Ortlieb, E., & Leung, C. B. (2016). Rethinking the writing process: What best-selling and award-winning authors have to say. Journal of Adolescent & Adult Literacy, 60(3), 265-274.

Sampson, M.R. (2014) Curriculum for e-Learners: Reading and writing. In R. Papa, (Ed) Media rich instruction: Connecting curriculum to all learners. Dordrecht, The Netherlands: Springer.

Sampson, M.R. (2014) Learning to read naturally: The Martin model of reading. Childhood Education International: Early Years. 1-2.

Sampson, M.R. (2013) Literacies and the 21st Century Child. In Powell,P. & Wiebke, K., Eds) Strong Start: Early Education in Arizona, 107-116.

Torre, C.E. and Sampson, M. R. (2012) Toward a Culture of Educational Assessment in Daily Life. In Constance M. Yowell and Lee Shulman, (Eds) The Future of Assessment in Education, Columbia University Press.http://www.gordoncommission.org/rsc/pdf/torre_sampson_toward_culture_ educational_assessment.pdf

Sampson, M. R. (2008).  "Language for Literacy." Reporter: Journal of the NYS Association for the Education of Young Children, Spring 2008, pp. 14–19.

Sampson, M.B., Sampson, M.R. & Rasinski, T. (2003)   Total Literacy: Pathways to Reading, Writing and Learning.   Wadsworth: San Francisco.

Sampson, M.R. & Sampson, M.B.  (2004)  Literacy.  The International Institute of Literacy Learning.  Dallas, TX.

Sampson, M. R. & Sampson, M. B.  (1999).  "The Language Experience Approach:  Yesterday, Today and Tomorrow." In O. G. Nelson and W. M. Linek (Eds.), Practical classroom Applications of Language Experience:  Looking Back and Looking Forward.  pp. 263–268.  Boston:  Allyn and Bacon.

Sampson, M. B., Linek, W. M., & Sampson, M. R. (1999).   "Circle of questions/circle of knowledge:  A strategy to foster college students’ engagement with text."  Innovative learning strategies:  College reading improvement yearbook.

Kanouse, C., Sampson, M.R. and Coker, D.R.  "University Faculty Development in the Professional Development School."  Catalyst for Change, Fall 1995.

Sampson, M.B., Sampson, M.R. and Linek, W.  "Circle of questions."  The Reading Teacher, Spring 1995.

Sampson, M.R.  White, J.H., and Briggs, L.D.   "Student authorship and reading:  The joy of literacy."  Reading Improvement, Summer 1988.

Sampson, M.B., Sampson, M.R., and Briggs, L.D.  "Miscues and learning."   Reading:  From Theory To Practice.  1986 Yearbook of the State of Maryland, International Reading Association, 1986, 28–32.

Sampson, M.R., Briggs, L.D. and Sampson, M.B. "Language, Children, and Text:  Match or Mismatch?"  In M.R. Sampson (Ed.) The Pursuit of Literacy:  Early Reading and Writing. Dubuque:  Kendall/Hunt Publishing Company, 1986, 97–103.

Sampson, M.R.  and Thomason, T. "When to teach reading:  They're never too young to begin."  Living With Preschoolers, November, 1985, 16–20.

Sampson, M.R.  and Thomason, T. "Children's 'mistakes' in reading: Should we correct them?" NABE Journal IX, No. 1, Fall 1984, 8–11.

Iley, J.L. and Sampson, M.R. "Reading: The smart way." Industrial Education, May 1984, 22.

Sampson, M.R. and Breen, R.B. "Reading begins at home:  Old myths and new research." ACT, April, 1984, 3, 6–9.

Sampson, M.R. and Breen, R.B. "Reading begins at home:  Guidelines for parents."  ACT, May/June, 1984, 4, 4–5.

Sampson, M.R. and Thomason, T. "Preschool literacy." Tender Years, September 1984, 4, 26–28.

Sampson, M.R. "Focus on comprehension: ReQuest." Ohio Reading Teacher, April 1984, 3, 13–15.

Sampson, M.R. and Briggs, L.D. "A new technique for cloze scoring:  A semantically consistent method." Clearing House, December 1983, 57, 177–179.

Sampson, M.R., Briggs, L.D. and Coker, D.R. "Assessing the listening comprehension of children." Reading Improvement.  Spring 1984,  21, 59–63.

Sampson, M.R. and Thomason, T. "Reading: A skill the Christian home can't afford to neglect." Christian Life, November 1983, 88–89, 94.

Breen, R.B. and Sampson, M.R. "Learning through affirmative reading." The Creative Child and Adult Quarterly, Spring 1983, 36–38.

Sampson, M. R. "A comparison of the complexity of children's dictation and instructional reading materials." New Inquiries in Reading Research and Instruction. National Reading Conference 1982 
Yearbook, 177–180.

Sampson, M.R., Valmont, W.J. and Allen, R.V. "The effects of   instructional cloze on the comprehension, vocabulary, and divergent production of third-grade students." Reading Research Quarterly, 1982, 17, 389–399.

Sampson, M.R. and Briggs, L.D. "What does research say about beginning reading?" Reading Horizons, Winter 1981, 21, 114–118.

Sampson, M.R. and Santos, S. "The bilingual child in your classroom: Tips for reading instruction." Perspectives on Reading and Bilingualism, Spring 1981, 3–11.

Briggs, L.D. and Sampson, M.R. "Developing interest in reading." Home Ideas for Reading, May 1980, 4, 1–3.

Sampson, M.R. and Sampson, M.B. "Components of a language experience approach." Catalyst for Change: Journal of the National School Development Council, 1980, 9, 10–14.

Sampson, M.R. "Secondary school reading programs with a research base." Research on Reading in Secondary Schools, eds. J.L. Vaughan, Jr. and P.J. Gaus (Tucson, Ariz.:  College of Education, 1978), pp. 29–39.

References

External links 

 
 Michael Sampson & Bill Martin, Jr. (co-authors)
 

1952 births
Living people
American children's writers
American educational theorists
Southern Connecticut State University faculty
Writers from Texas
People from Denison, Texas